Operation Woodrose was a military operation carried out by the Indira Gandhi-led Indian government in the months after Operation Blue Star to "prevent the outbreak of widespread public protest" in the state of Punjab. The government arrested all prominent members of the largest Sikh political party, the Akali Dal, and banned the All India Sikh Students Federation, a large students' union. In addition, the Indian Army conducted operations in the countryside during which thousands of Sikhs, overwhelmingly young men, were detained for interrogation and subsequently tortured. Despite its purported success in controlling the armed insurgency in the Punjab region, the operation was criticized by human-rights groups for the suspension of civil liberties and habeas corpus, resulting in the disappearances of thousands of Sikh men. After the operation, the central government was criticized for using "draconian legislation" to repress a minority community.

Conduct of the operation
The operation consisted of the rounding up of thousands of Sikh youth and civilians. Troops would lay siege to targeted villages in the early-morning hours, confining the inhabitants to their houses and stopping all movement out of the village while conducting house-to house raids. Some villages experienced repeated sieges. Sikh homes were raided indiscriminately, with an overwhelming number of detained being innocents.

According to estimates published by Inderjit Singh Jaijee, approximately 8,000 individuals were reported as missing or killed by October 1984 as a result of Army operations during Woodrose alone (not including Operation Blue Star where over 5,000 civilians were killed) by state media, though Punjabi-language media estimated much higher figures. According to Dr. Sangat Singh, who served in the Joint Intelligence Committee of the Government of India in the 1970s, about 100,000 youth had been taken into custody within the first four to six weeks of the operation, with many not heard from again, with many taken into custody beaten and tortured.

The operation was mainly concentrated in the border districts, and all amritdhari, or initiated, Sikh men from ages 15 to 60, particularly between 15 and 35, were referred to as "potential" terrorists in Army communiqués and targeted and taken from border villages. Since the most likely targets were youth, many would try to flee across the border to Pakistan as the army approached. At first, Pakistani authorities jailed them as trespassers, before realizing their potential use, exploiting their resentment and distress to return a number of them as armed, motivated militants. About 20,000 fleeing youth are estimated to have crossed the border.

Extrajudicial abuse extended even to distinguished Sikh army veterans; as Sikh ex-servicemen formed a large proportion of the rural Sikh population at about half a million at any given time. Between the army's treatment of youth, veterans, and the old and infirm, rumors abounded in the countryside that the state was trying to wipe out the younger generation of a small minority and was systematically engaged in its suppression. An atmosphere of fear and suspicion continued in the countryside for several months. Even after the formal end of the operation in September 1984, the community remained at the mercy of the authoritarian state apparatus; its deep, long-lasting sense of distress and disgruntlement would later become a significant factor in precipitating the subsequent militancy.

Even after the operation, hundreds of men, women, and even children, picked up from the countryside, remained incarcerated.

Punjab-Chandigarh Disturbed Area Act (1983) and other measures
To allow for the legality of the operation, the states of Punjab and Chandigarh had been declared by the Indian government as 'disturbed areas' by the enactment of the Punjab Chandigarh Disturbed Area Act 1983, while the Army was given unprecedented powers to detain and arrest civilians by the enactment of the Armed Forces (Punjab and Chandigarh) Act 1983. The act empowered any commissioned, warrant or non-commissioned officer of the Army if "of opinion that it is necessary so to do for the maintenance of public order, after giving such due warning as he may consider necessary, fire upon or otherwise use forces, even to the causing of death". The act also allowed such an officer to "arrest, without warrant, any person who has committed a cognizable offence or against whom a reasonable suspicion exists that he has committed or is about to commit a cognizable offence".

Fast Track courts were set up under the Terrorist Affected Areas (Special Courts) Act 1984  to try to sentence suspected terrorists rapidly.

Outcome

Punjab Chief of Police, Kanwar Pal Singh Gill described the actions as "suffering from all the classical defects of army intervention in civil strife" and stated that the Indian Army had acted "blindly".

The army operations were overseen by Major General Jagdish Singh Jamwal, who was assigned the responsibility to seal the international border with Pakistan, in an attempt to control smuggling of arms and personnel, and by Lieutenant General Ranjit Singh Dyal, who was instructed to oversee the apprehension of militants in state of Punjab.

See also 

 Kharku
 Operation Black Thunder

References

Insurgency in Punjab
History of Sikhism
1980s in India
Operations involving Indian special forces